Thunderbirds is a 2004 science fiction action-adventure film directed by Jonathan Frakes, based on the 1960s TV series Thunderbirds created by Gerry and Sylvia Anderson. The film, written by William Osborne and Michael McCullers, was released on 20 July 2004 in the United Kingdom and 30 July 2004 in the United States.

The film's plot concerns the Hood, who traps International Rescue (IR) leader Jeff Tracy and four of his sons on board the damaged Thunderbird 5 to steal the other Thunderbirds vehicles and commit heists that IR will be blamed for, prompting Jeff's youngest son Alan and his friends Tin-Tin and Fermat to stop him. In contrast with the original TV series, which used a combination of puppetry and scale-model special effects dubbed "Supermarionation", this film was made in live action with CGI effects.

The film received negative reviews from critics, who disparaged its wooden characters and thin plot, and was a box-office bomb. Gerry Anderson was also critical of the film, describing it as "the biggest load of crap I have ever seen in my entire life", although Sylvia Anderson praised it as a "great tribute" to the series. The film's soundtrack includes the songs "Thunderbirds Are Go" by pop-rock band Busted, which peaked at number one in the UK charts and later won the 2004 UK Record of the Year award and Take Me Away by Caleigh Peters which was used for other countries excluding the UK.

Plot
The Tracy family, led by former astronaut Jeff Tracy, operate International Rescue (IR), a secret organization that aids those in need during disasters using technologically advanced machines called Thunderbirds, operating out of Tracy Island in the South Pacific. Youngest son Alan attends a boarding school in Massachusetts, with his best friend Fermat Hackenbacker, son of the Thunderbirds’ resident engineer Brains, and dreams of being a Thunderbird pilot. 

The pair are distracted by a news report following the Thunderbirds performing a rescue at a Russian oil rig. Unbeknownst to them, the Hood, a psychic criminal mastermind, has had one of his accomplices plant a tracking beacon on the hull of Thunderbird 1. Alan and Fermat are transported home to Tracy Island by Lady Penelope Creighton-Ward, an IR agent, and her butler, Aloysius Parker, in FAB 1. Alan and Fermat unsuccessfully attempt to fly Thunderbird 1, alarming Jeff, which results in Alan getting grounded for the rest of spring break.

The Hood's submarine locates Tracy Island and fires a missile at the orbiting Thunderbird 5, sending Jeff and older sons Scott, Virgil and Gordon in Thunderbird 3 to rescue John Tracy. The Hood and his team, led by Mullion and Transom, take over the island's command centre, imprisoning the Tracys in Thunderbird 5 as their oxygen runs out. The Hood reveals that during one of International Rescue's first operations, Jeff abandoned him in a collapsing illegal diamond mine, but rescued his half-brother Kyrano, another Tracy Island resident. As revenge, he plans to use the Thunderbirds to rob ten of the major banks of the world, thus plunging the world's monetary system into chaos, with International Rescue held responsible and disgraced. 

Alan, Fermat and their friend Tin-Tin (Kyrano's daughter and Alan's crush), use a ventilation shaft to reach the Thunderbird silos. Fermat removes Thunderbird 2s guidance chip, delaying the Hood's plan, and the teenagers flee into the island's jungle to find the island's remote transmitter. After Alan has a close encounter with a venomous scorpion, Tin-Tin displays psychic powers similar to those of her uncle. 

Having made contact at the remote transmitter on one of the island's hills, Alan insists on confronting the Hood, but Jeff tells them to wait for Lady Penelope's arrival; contact is lost due to Transom's jamming before they can resolve the disagreement. The trio flees from Mullion and his men, and Alan insists on using a hovercraft with a trailer attached to it to get away, despite Fermat and Tin-Tin's reservations; they are proven right when the trailer breaks off, and they are captured.

Lady Penelope and Parker arrive, engaging the Hood's minions in combat, but the Hood defeats them with his powers. When Alan appears, the Hood forces him to give up the guidance chip and locks him and the others in the compound's walk-in freezer. The Hood, Mullion, and Transom pilot the now-repaired Thunderbird 2 to London and use the Mole to sink a monorail line into the Thames and drill into the Bank of England’s vaults. Alan and company escape and contact Jeff and his older sons, who regain control of Thunderbird 5. While the adults set out to stop the Hood, the teenagers and Lady Penelope fly to London in Thunderbird 1.

Arriving in London, Alan and Tin-Tin rescue the submerged monorail car using the aquatic Thunderbird 4 before pursuing the Hood. Together, Fermat, Tin-Tin, and Parker defeat the Hood's henchmen. The Hood locks Jeff and Lady Penelope in a vault and challenges Alan to defeat him. Alan dangles from a catwalk over the Mole, until Tin-Tin appears, using her own powers to defeat the Hood. The Hood taunts Alan to let him die as his father did, but Alan rescues him, knowing that his father had, in fact, tried unsuccessfully to save the Hood.

The Hood and his team are arrested, and International Rescue return to their island. Alan, Fermat, and Tin-Tin are inducted as official members of IR, and the film ends as they, alongside Alan's brothers, depart for their first mission.

Cast

 Brady Corbet as Alan Tracy, the 14-year-old main protagonist
 Bill Paxton as Jeff Tracy, the widowed father of Alan and his brothers
 Ben Kingsley as the Hood, Kyrano's half-brother, Tin-Tin's uncle, the movie's main antagonist
 Vanessa Hudgens as Tin-Tin, Alan's crush
 Soren Fulton as Fermat Hackenbacker, Alan's best friend
 Sophia Myles as Lady Penelope Creighton-Ward, International Rescue's London agent
 Ron Cook as Aloysius Parker, Lady Penelope's butler/chauffeur
 Anthony Edwards as Ray "Brains" Hackenbacker, the engineer who created the Thunderbirds, Fermat's father
 Philip Winchester as Scott Tracy, Alan's oldest brother, aged 24, pilot of Thunderbird 1
 Lex Shrapnel as John Tracy, Alan's kind-hearted second oldest brother, aged 22, space monitor of Thunderbird 5
 Dominic Colenso as Virgil Tracy, Alan's third oldest brother, aged 20, pilot of Thunderbird 2
 Ben Torgersen as Gordon Tracy, Alan's fourth oldest brother, aged 18, astronaut of Thunderbird 3
 Bhasker Patel as Kyrano, Jeff's retainer and Tin-Tin's father
 Harvey Virdi as Onaha, Tin-Tin's mother
 Deobia Oparei as Mullion, one of the Hood's goons, a martial arts expert
 Rose Keegan as Transom, one of the Hood's goons, who has a crush on Brains

Production

Development 
Thunderbirds was the third theatrical release based upon the series created by Gerry and Sylvia Anderson. It was preceded by Thunderbirds Are Go in 1966 and Thunderbird 6 in 1968, both films using the Supermarionation production techniques of the series.

Production of the film started in the mid-1990s when PolyGram Filmed Entertainment purchased the rights to the entire ITC Entertainment library, which included the original Thunderbirds series. Seeing the big-screen potential of the series, Peter Hewitt was signed on to direct, while Karey Kirkpatrick was signed on to write. While Hewitt was a lifelong fan of the series, Kirkpatrick was not, but watched all 32 episodes of the original series to immerse himself within the lore of the series. Hewitt and Kirkpatrick wrote a draft of the screenplay which was faithful to the series, but which they hoped would not alienate audiences who were unfamiliar with the franchise. Their script featured The Hood trying to steal Tracy Island's power core to power a device controlled by arch villain Thaddeus Stone, which would transfer all of Earth's gravity to the moon. After four drafts, Kirkpatrick left the project due to Working Title's concerns that the film would not play well in the US market. (Working Title was the unit of PolyGram, and later Universal Studios when that company in 1999 bought out PolyGram's assets, that produced films in Britain.) Hewitt also left the production shortly afterwards due to his dislike for the new direction the film was taking.

Hewitt was replaced by Jonathan Frakes, who was a big fan of the original series. whose credentials included another film in the science fiction family film genre, Clockstoppers. 

Mike Trim, who had worked on the original Thunderbirds show, was hired as a concept artist. Ultimately, his work, which included a design for an original pod vehicle named the "Telehandler", went unused.

Casting 
The film was the first family film of Brady Corbet, who played protagonist Alan Tracy. 

Bill Paxton took on the role of Alan's father, billionaire ex-astronaut Jeff Tracy. He had memories of watching the show as a child in Texas; a year before he was asked to join the film, he had been watching the show with his jetlagged family as it was the only English video he'd been able to find in Amsterdam. Of the role, Paxton said that he played "a kind of teacher, this father figure who has to teach his sons, particularly his youngest son Alan, these basic lessons of ethics and integrity, about doing the right thing". One reason that he was attracted to the role was because it reminded him of 1960s non-profit vocationalism, and people "choosing life professions not for monetary gain but for something that would be good for their souls".

Ben Kingsley accepted the part of the Hood because his children were Thunderbirds fans and, having just finished with House of Sand and Fog, he was ready for a more lighthearted role. He described himself as feeling "totally at home" on set, but joked that he should have kept the original Hood's voice.

Sophia Myles was cast as Lady Penelope, who would recall Frakes as "lovely", and having a "great, positive energy". Much of her dialogue (and Ron Cook's as Parker) was rewritten by Richard Curtis, as it wasn't thought to be funny enough. It was because of watching the film with his son that Steven Moffat offered Myles a role in Series 2 of Doctor Who.

Anthony Edwards was cast as Brains; he joined the production imagining it was a "silly little kids' movie", but was impressed by Frakes', and production designer John Beard's, "reverence" for the original series. He also recalled the producers hoping Gerry Anderson would be a part of the production;  conversely, Jamie Anderson claims that Gerry was "kept at an arm's length" from the project, and that only in the final stages of post-production was he offered a large sum of money to promote the film, which he declined.

Filming and post-production 
Filming began on March 3, 2003 at North Island in the Seychelles. An initial 7-day schedule became 10 days after unexpected rain interfered with the shoot, and Fulton, who played Fermat, had to try and avoid developing a tan.  Throughout production Corbet was vocal about what he saw as flaws in the script; Corbet would go on to write and direct films of his own.Filming later moved to Pinewood Studios and on-location shooting in London. Upon arriving in London, Paxton, in order to immerse himself in the role, invited Winchester, Colenso, Torgersen, Corbet and Shrapnel for a meal. Shrapnel would later recall the experience positively, calling Paxton a "great role model and a very dear friend".

Other filming locations included Wellington College, Berkshire for Alan's school ("Wharton Academy"), University College London for the exterior of the fictional Bank of London, and Cliveden House, Buckinghamshire for Lady Penelope's mansion; this latter location had speed bumps removed from the drive to avoid damage to the FAB 1 vehicle. 

A number of scenes were excised from the final cut of the film. A different opening was filmed, with Alan partaking in some kind of motorcycle race; footage was included in trailers for the film. FAB-1 was also intended to be fired at by missiles when approaching Tracy Island for the second time, upon which a pedalo life raft would deploy; footage of this is utilised for a comedic scene at the end of the film. Versions of both scenes are present in novelizations and tie-in books. 

Thunderbirds is dedicated to the memory of Stephen Lowen, a rigger on the film, who died in a fall whilst dismantling one of the sets.

Differences from the original 

There are numerous changes from the original series. The Thunderbirds fleet, Tracy Island, and the International Rescue uniforms have all been redesigned; Tracy Island is now referred to by name in dialogue, as is the Hood. International Rescue is also referred to as "Thunderbirds" by the general public.

Numerous promotional materials described this version of Jeff Tracy as having set up International Rescue in the year 2010. As such, a common misconception is that the film's setting was changed to this year from the original's 2065 setting. Working trailers confirm that the actual events of the film take place in March of 2020, but the mistake was proliferated enough to impact merchandise.

In the original series, Alan and Tin-Tin are much closer to the age of the rest of the Tracy brothers. Fermat Hackenbacker and Onaha are new characters conceived for the film, with the latter taking the position of Grandma Tracy, who has been omitted from the film. The Kyrano change nationality in the film; they are Malaysian in the TV series but are depicted as being from India in the film.

Although the exact identities of the Thunderbirds remain secret, International Rescue now allows itself to be filmed and photographed on missions, which was forbidden in the original series.

Reception

Box office
Thunderbirds grossed $28,283,637 worldwide, and with an estimated $57 million budget, the film was a box-office bomb. Frakes attributed the film's box office failure to a combination of stiff competition from its contemporaries Shrek 2 and Spider-Man 2 and its poor critical reception.

Critical response
Thunderbirds received negative reviews. Those familiar with the series tended to be more negative. Sukhdev Sandhu of The Daily Telegraph called it "a quite cretinous travesty of the original series", saying that the film lacks the TV series's romantic approach to technology (particularly mentioning its rushed version of the countdown to the Thunderbirds takeoff) and suffers from thin plotting and dialogue. He also regarded the entire trend of making films based on decades-old TV series as good-intentioned but misguided, arguing, "Those programmes can be seen on terrestrial and cable TV. They're available on DVD. They don't need reviving and updating." The Houston Chronicles Amy Biancolli similarly called the film a "rather breathtakingly misconceived attempt to revisit a vintage TV show that did not under any circumstances need to be revisited". She found the central character Alan "whiny and uninteresting", the script poor, the plot contrived and unsatisfying, and the acting wooden, though she noted that her three children enjoyed it much more than she did. She gave it a C−. Ian Freer, writing for Empire, assessed that the film fails to either evoke nostalgia in the generation which watched Thunderbirds as children or provide snappy entertainment for the current generation of children. Like Sandhu, he felt the countdown sequence was so rushed that there is no sense of occasion to a Thunderbird taking to the sky. He also said that the child leads lack spirit and chemistry, and the adult characters suffer from excessive exposition and flat characterization. While he did praise Sophia Myles's performance and the vehicle designs, he considered the film an overall failure and gave it two out of five stars. On the review aggregation site Rotten Tomatoes, the film holds a 19% "rotten" rating based on 106 reviews. The site's consensus states: "Live-action cartoon for kids." Critics widely described the film as a second-rate Spy Kids imitator.

During development, creator Gerry Anderson was invited to act as creative consultant, but was left out when the studio felt there were enough employees on the payroll acting as part of the creative team. The studio offered him $750,000 (£432,000) to attend the premiere but Anderson could not accept money from people he had not worked for. He eventually saw the film on DVD and was disappointed, declaring "It was disgraceful that such a huge amount of money was spent with people who had no idea what Thunderbirds was about and what made it tick." He also said that it was "the biggest load of crap I have ever seen in my entire life".

Co-creator Sylvia Anderson, and the one responsible for character development, was given a private screening of the film and attended the London premiere. She expressed a far different opinion to that of her former husband, stating "I felt that I'd been on a wonderful Thunderbirds adventure. You, the fans, will I'm sure, appreciate the sensitive adaptation and I'm personally thrilled that the production team have paid us the great compliment of bringing to life our original concept for the big screen. If we had made it ourselves (and we have had over 30 years to do it!) we could not have improved on this new version. It is a great tribute to the original creative team who inspired the movie all those years ago. It was a personal thrill for me to see my characters come to life on the big screen."

Timed to coincide with the theatrical release of Thunderbirds, the two prior films were released on DVD. The DVD versions of all three films include a number of extra features, including historical and production information.

Legacy 
Though Thunderbirds has had a negative reputation with many fans of the original franchise, cast members frequently speak about the film having devoted fans, especially those who were children when the film was released. The film is occasionally critically reassessed, and castmembers frequently praise their time working on the film; Sophia Myles has said "It was amazing ... I only have the fondest of memories of making that film, [and] quite frankly I don't really care what anyone else thought ... for me it was one of the best times of my life." Dominic Colenso, who moved to a career as a communications expert, often describes himself as a "Former Thunderbird".

A 60-foot model of Thunderbird 3, based on Dominic Lavery's design for the film, was created to market it, and stood in Trafalgar Square close to the film's release. It was subsequently displayed in Blackpool (at one point being decorated with images from Pablo Picasso's Guernica)  until early 2008, when it was purchased by Eastern Airways; at present it remains on display at Humberside Airport.

Soundtrack 
 "Thunderbirds Are Go" – performed by Busted (United Kingdom release only)
 Take Me Away - performed by Caleigh Peters (all releases excluding the United Kingdom)

References
Primary sources

Secondary sources

Further reading

External links

 
 
 
 
 

2000s action adventure films
2000s children's adventure films
2000s coming-of-age films
2000s heist films
2000s science fiction adventure films
2004 films
2004 science fiction action films
American action adventure films
American aviation films
American children's adventure films
American coming-of-age films
American films about revenge
American heist films
American science fiction action films
American science fiction adventure films
American space adventure films
British action adventure films
British children's adventure films
British coming-of-age films
British films about revenge
British heist films
British science fiction action films
British space adventure films
Films based on Thunderbirds (TV series)
Films directed by Jonathan Frakes
Films produced by Tim Bevan
Films produced by Eric Fellner
Films scored by Hans Zimmer
Films set in 2010
Films set in England
Films set in London
Films set in Massachusetts
Films shot in England
Films shot in London
Films shot at Pinewood Studios
Films shot in Seychelles
Films with screenplays by Michael McCullers
Flying cars in fiction
StudioCanal films
Teen adventure films
Universal Pictures films
Working Title Films films
2000s English-language films
2000s American films
2000s British films